Hugo Roberto Colace (born January 6, 1984) is an Argentine football manager and former professional footballer who was most recently manager of Bangor City in the Cymru North.

He previously played for French side AJ Auxerre, Série A club Flamengo and Argentine top level clubs.

He left Barnsley on June 30, 2010. He turned down Crystal Palace to return to Barnsley on July 20th. At the end of the 2010–11 Championship season, he was released from Barnsley.

Club career
Born in Buenos Aires, Colace joined Flamengo on August 30, 2007, and on September 23, 2007, he played his first match as a Flamengo player, a Campeonato Brasileiro match against Juventude at Estádio Alfredo Jaconi, in which he came as a substitute for Cristian. He joined English club Barnsley on a three-year deal on June 27, 2008. During the 2009-10 season, Colace scored 8 goals in all competitions. He received Barnsley's player of the season and player's player of the season award on April 21, 2010, but was not keen on signing a new contract. He finally agreed to return to Oakwell on July 20, 2010, signing a two-year contract.

Listed for loan due to a loss in form with Barnsley, on May 31, 2011 Colace signed with Mexican club Estudiantes Tecos. Tecos was relegated in the 2011-12 season and he joined Ligue 2 side AJ Auxerre in September 2012.

On 6 November 2015 it was announced that Colace would be spending some time on trial at his former club, Barnsley, in the hope of earning a contract.

On 2 January 2020,  Colace signed with Welsh club Bangor City F.C. and became player-manager in 2020. In October 2021 his contract with the club was terminated after a club investigation into his conduct and the team's performance in the league that season. He contested the charges made against him by the club in a statement released on social media and highlighted the lack of payment of staff and players by the club's President.

International career
Colace represented the Argentina national under-20 football team in the FIFA World Youth Championship in 2003, when his country finished in the fourth position. He captained the side which included players such as Carlos Tevez, Javier Mascherano and Pablo Zabaleta.

Club career statistics
(correct as of July 19, 2010)

References

External links
 
 
 Player profile at the Brazilian FA database 
 

1984 births
Living people
Footballers from Buenos Aires
Argentine footballers
Argentine Primera División players
Argentina under-20 international footballers
Argentina youth international footballers
Argentinos Juniors footballers
Newell's Old Boys footballers
Estudiantes de La Plata footballers
Argentine expatriate footballers
Expatriate footballers in Brazil
Expatriate footballers in Paraguay
CR Flamengo footballers
Expatriate footballers in England
English Football League players
Barnsley F.C. players
Expatriate footballers in Mexico
Liga MX players
Tecos F.C. footballers
Expatriate footballers in France
Ligue 2 players
AJ Auxerre players
Mons Calpe S.C. players
Association football midfielders
Argentine expatriate sportspeople in England
Argentine expatriate sportspeople in Brazil
Argentine expatriate sportspeople in France
Pan American Games medalists in football
Pan American Games gold medalists for Argentina
Footballers at the 2003 Pan American Games
Medalists at the 2003 Pan American Games
Bangor City F.C. managers
Bangor F.C. players
Expatriate footballers in Wales
Expatriate football managers in Wales